Anarsia anisodonta is a moth of the family Gelechiidae. It was described by Alexey Diakonoff in 1954. It is found in New Guinea and Queensland.

Adults have grey forewings with a triangular black mark on the costa.

References

anisodonta
Moths described in 1954
Moths of New Guinea
Moths of Australia